In the United States, political parties nominate one candidate each for President of the United States and for Vice President of the United States. These candidates attempt to win presidential elections by taking a majority of the electoral vote. The two candidates together are known as a ticket. Many states did not hold popular votes for the presidential election prior to the advent of Jacksonian Democracy in the 1820s. Prior to the ratification of the 12th Amendment in 1804, electors cast two votes for president rather than one vote for president and one vote for vice president. Under the pre-12th Amendment Constitution, the candidate with the most votes became president and the candidate with the second most votes became vice president; hence, all candidates were technically running against each other. The listed ages are as of election day; for races prior to 1845, December 1st is considered election day for the purposes of the list.

Major tickets
Included below are all of the major party (Democratic-Republican, Federalist, Democratic, National Republican, Whig, and Republican) presidential tickets in U.S. history, along with the nonpartisan candidacy of George Washington. Also included are independent and third party tickets that won at least ten percent of the popular or electoral vote. 

An asterisk (*) denotes elections held before the ratification of the 12th Amendment, which made significant changes to the presidential election process. An asterisk or caret (^) denotes elections held before 1832; before 1832, many states did not hold a popular vote for president.

Other significant tickets
The following post-1800 tickets won less than 10% of the popular vote and less than 10% of the electoral vote, but won more than 1% of the popular vote or at least one electoral vote from an elector who had pledged to vote for the ticket. A caret (^) denotes elections held before 1832; before 1832, many states did not hold a popular vote for president.

See also
List of third party and independent performances in United States elections
List of people who received an electoral vote in the United States Electoral College
Party divisions of United States Congresses

Notes

References

Sources and works cited

 
 
  Source for year of birth, age, and home state.
 Source for popular and electoral vote.
 Source for popular and electoral vote.

Presidential elections in the United States
Lists of candidates for President of the United States